Lasioglossum semisculptum, also known as the Lasioglossum (Ctenomia) semisculptum, is a species of bee in the genus Lasioglossum, of the family Halictidae.

References
 https://www.academia.edu/7390502/AN_UPDATED_CHECKLIST_OF_BEES_OF_SRI_LANKA_WITH_NEW_RECORDS
 http://animaldiversity.org/accounts/Lasioglossum_semisculptum/classification/
 https://www.itis.gov/servlet/SingleRpt/SingleRpt?search_topic=TSN&search_value=759276
 https://www.gbif.org/species/1355081
 http://apoidea.myspecies.info/taxonomy/term/6454

Notes

semisculptum
Insects described in 1911